

Oman
 Mombasa – Nasr ibn Abdallah al-Mazru‘i, Wali of Mombasa (1698–1728)

Portugal
 Angola – 
 Henrique de Figueiredo e Alarcão, Governor of Angola (1717–1722)
 António de Albuquerque Coelho de Carvalho, Governor of Angola (1722–1725)
 Macau –
 Antonio da Silva Telo e Meneses, Governor of Macau (1719–1722)
 D.Cristovao de Severim Manuel, Governor of Macau (1722–1724)

Colonial governors
Colonial governors
1722